Sir Thomas Jermyn (1573–1645) of Rushbrooke, Suffolk, was an English courtier and Royalist who served as a Member of Parliament between 1604 and 1640.

Early life
Jermyn was the son of Sir Robert Jermyn of Rushbrooke. He was admitted at Emmanuel College, Cambridge in 1585. He was knighted at Rouen, France, in 1591 and became a Knight of the Bath in 1603.

Career
In 1604 Jermyn was elected as a Member of Parliament for Andover in Hampshire, which seat he held until 1611. In 1614 he was elected as an MP for the prestigious county seat of Suffolk. He was elected for Bury St Edmunds, Suffolk, in the elections in 1621, 1623, 1625, 1626 and 1628. In 1629 King Charles I decided to rule for eleven years without parliament.

In April 1640 Jermyn was re-elected for Bury St Edmunds in the Short Parliament. He became Lord Lieutenant of Suffolk in 1640, and served as Comptroller of the Royal Household between 1639 and 1641. He fought as a Royalist during the Civil War, became disabled through injury in 1644 and died in the following year aged 72.

Marriage and issue

Jermyn married Catherine Killigrew (born 1579), a daughter of Sir William Killigrew (died 1622) of Hanworth, Middlesex, a courtier to Queen Elizabeth I and to King James I, whom he served as Groom of the Privy Chamber. Her portrait by Marcus Gheeraerts the Younger (1561–1636) survives in the collection of the Yale Center for British Art, Connecticut, USA. By his wife he had issue including:
Thomas Jermyn (died 1659), eldest surviving son, MP for Bury St Edmunds;
Henry Jermyn, 1st Earl of St Albans.

External links

References

|-

|-
 

1573 births
1645 deaths
16th-century English people
Cavaliers
English courtiers
English knights
English MPs 1604–1611
English MPs 1614
English MPs 1621–1622
English MPs 1624–1625
English MPs 1625
English MPs 1626
English MPs 1628–1629
English MPs 1640 (April)
Thomas
Knights of the Bath
Lord-Lieutenants of Suffolk
People from Rushbrooke with Rougham